The  was part of the strategic bombing campaign waged by the United States against military and civilian targets and population centers during the Japan home islands campaign in the closing stages of World War II.

Background
Although the city of Numazu was not a major population center, it had a number of targets of military significance centered on its port facility, including a ship repair yard, and a number of small and medium-sized factories supplying military equipment and munitions. The Tōkaidō Main Line railway connecting Tokyo with Osaka also ran through the city. Numazu was also located at the base of Mount Fuji, a prominent landmark used by bombers en route to Tokyo or Nagoya from the Mariana Islands, and thus often served as a secondary target for bombers unable to complete their primary mission assignment.

Air raids
Numazu was bombed eight times during World War II, the largest air raid occurring on the night of July 17, 1945. During this attack, 130 B-29 Superfortress bombers of the USAAF 20th Air Force, 58th Bombardment Wing dropped a total of 1,039 tons of incendiary bombs on the city, resulting in a firestorm which destroyed most of the city. The estimated civilian casualties were 274 people killed, and 9,523 homes destroyed in this raid; however, total casualties came to 322 killed, 634 severely injured, and 11,883 homes destroyed over the course of the war.

A year after the war, the United States Army Air Forces's Strategic Bombing Survey (Pacific War) reported that 89.5 percent of the city had been totally destroyed.

See also
Strategic bombing during World War II
 Air raids on Japan
 Evacuations of civilians in Japan during World War II

References

External links
Pacific War Chronology
67 Japanese Cities Firebombed in World War II

Notes

History of Shizuoka Prefecture
Numazu
Japan in World War II
Numazu
Numazu
World War II strategic bombing of Japan
1945 in Japan
Firebombings in Japan
Japan–United States military relations
Numazu, Shizuoka